Marriage in Ireland (the Republic of Ireland) is a long-standing institution, regulated by various civil and religious codes over time.  Today marriages are registered by the civil registration service, and solemnised by a solemniser chosen from a list maintained by Department of Social Protection. The list includes priests, imams, rabbis, humanist celebrants, civil registrars themselves, and others.

How to register 
Three months advance notice of intent to marry, provided to the local branch of the civil registration service, is required, starting from when the relevant application is received by the service. 

A marriage registration form must be prepared, and issued by the relevant civil registrar; sometimes known as a marriage licence, no legal marriage can now occur without this.  

Prior to the issue of the form, couples at least one of whom is a foreign national, or involving an EU national and a non-EU national, must attend an interview, and in certain circumstances, the civil registrar can refuse to issue the marriage licence.  Such decisions can be appealed to the courts. The marriage registration form is finalised after the solemnisation of the marriage, and becomes valid when signed by the two parties to the wedding, and the solemniser.

Statistics 
As of 2017, 52.8% of opposite sex marriages were solemnised in Catholic church services, while 1,727 couples, for example, solemnised with Humanist Association of Ireland services and 1,159 couples with Spiritual Union of Ireland services. 

As of 2015, about 1/3 of marriages were solemnised by civil registrars; a limitation on this service was that it could only perform the ceremony from Monday to Friday, though venues beyond civil registry offices were permitted, with certain exclusions, such as beaches and private back gardens.

Arranged marriages, both legal and illegal, were common before the end of the twentieth century, but later became more common among immigrant communities.

Activism and Reform 
Prior to 1995, divorce was constitutionally prohibited; both church and civil annulments (declarations that a marriage never existed legally, for example for reasons of incapacity) were possible but rare.  Although the Catholic Church campaigned against divorce, the Fifteenth Amendment of the Constitution of Ireland passed in 1995, and divorce was legalised.

Same-sex marriage in the Republic of Ireland has been legal since 16 November 2015, following the 2015 Irish constitutional referendum. Its introduction was preceded by the use of civil partnerships in 2010, which gave same-sex couples rights and responsibilities similar, but not equal to, those of civil marriage.

References